UTA Radio is an alternative/indie rock college radio station based at The University of Texas at Arlington in Arlington, Texas. The station is an online radio operation run primarily by students with the help of faculty and staff members from the Department of Communication. Its slogan is Online All The Time.

History
UTA Radio's studios and classrooms have been in use since the 1970s. Programs at the time were delivered over the department's loudspeaker system since there was no terrestrial radio signal to broadcast on. By the 90s, cable television provided another outlet for programs and class projects. In the spring of 2000, UTA Radio began internet broadcasts by providing live coverage of UTA baseball and softball.

Since 2007, UTA Radio has provided 24/7 broadcasts thanks to broadcast automation software provided by Wide Orbit Systems.  In addition to its regular music format, the station also provides play-by-play coverage for UTA's basketball, baseball, softball, and volleyball teams. The ease and portability of internet broadcasting has allowed UTA Radio to deliver high-quality programming at a fraction of the cost.

In March 2012, UTA Radio joined the iHeartRadio streaming platform.

Awards
In 2011, the station won a Radio Mercury Award in the student PSA category.  The station was again a finalist in 2013, 2018, and 2022.

In 2012, and again in 2013, UTA Radio was nominated for a CMJ College Radio Award for 'Best Student Run, Internet-only Station'. 

2017 saw the station earn honorable mention for the Broadcast Educators Association (BEA) Signature Station Award

Notable Activities
 Rocktober, first aired in October, 2011.  Annual concert series features local bands whose music is featured on UTA Radio.
 In 2018, the station played nothing but vinyl records for 24 hours as part of College Radio Day's Vinython.
 On October 5th, 2018, the station was the only college station in the US to broadcast for World College Radio Day's 24-hour marathon.

Notable alumni
Candice Huckeba, DJ, Radio Disney  
Josh Sours, Sports Broadcaster, UTA Athletics  
Eli Jordan, Sports Broadcaster, KTCK-FM 
Jeff K, DJ/PA Announcer, KZPS 92.5, Dallas Stars, Dallas Cowboys
Linah Mohammad, Producer, All Things Considered
Parker Hillis, Executive Producer, 104.3 The Fan
Jason Kellison, Program Coordinator, 
Terri Nolan, Writer, 
Cory Mose, Sports Reporter,

External links
 Official website
 UTA Department of Communication

References

Radio stations in Texas
University of Texas at Arlington
College radio stations in Texas
Radio stations established in 1973
Internet radio stations in the United States